Christopher Manson is a children's book author and illustrator noted for his use of traditional hand tools to painstakingly make the pine woodcuts that fill his several highly acclaimed works.

Background

Born in Buffalo, New York, Manson graduated in 1975 from the Nova Scotia College of Art and Design in Halifax, Nova Scotia, having specialized in printmaking.  He also obtained a Master of Fine Arts from the State University of New York at New Paltz (SUNY New Paltz).

He returned to Buffalo, where he took a job at a local arts council in arts management, a position that required fundraising skills.  "It wasn't for me," he later recalled. "I figured out that I was tired of helping others make their art."

Career

After illustrating a friend's cookbook, he published the phenomenally popular children's book, MAZE: Solve the World's Most Challenging Puzzle (1985), issued by the major publishing house Henry Holt and Company.  The book promised a $10,000 award to whoever solved the book's many visual puzzles, and even though the contest has long since ended, the book remains in print, and was reissued as a computer game in CD-ROM format.

Manson summed up his approach to his authoring and illustrating children's books like so: "What I'm really after is the perfect book. The kind where you just can't imagine the words without the pictures, or the pictures without the words . . . like [Winnie-the-Pooh author A. A.] Milne. But there aren't that many out there to point to as perfect. I'm constantly working toward it."  He added, "Even if I won the 40 million dollar lottery, I'd still do this — I'd have a fancier studio, but I'd still do this."

Works
Author and illustrator:

MAZE: Solve the World's Most Challenging Puzzle (1985) 
The Rails I Tote: Forty-Five Illustrated Spoonerisms to Decipher (1987) 
The Practical Alchemist: Showing The Way An Ordinary House-Cat May Be Transformed Into True Gold (1988) 
A Gift For The King: A Persian Tale (1989) 
Two Travelers (1990) 
The Crab Prince: An Entertainment For Children (1991) 
The Marvellous Blue Mouse (1992)

Illustrator:

The Norman Table: The Traditional Cooking of Normandy (1985) 
A Farmyard Song (1992) 
The Tree in the Wood: An Old Nursery Song (1993) 
Good King Wenceslas (1994) 
Till Year's Good End (1997) 
Over the River and through the Wood (1998) 
Uncle Sam and Old Glory (2000) 
Black Swan/White Crow (2007)

References 

American children's writers
Living people
American children's book illustrators
Writers from Buffalo, New York
People from Rockville, Maryland
State University of New York at New Paltz alumni
NSCAD University alumni
Artists from Buffalo, New York
Year of birth missing (living people)